Alan Cuff (7 June 1908 – 23 April 1995) was an Australian cricketer. He played one first-class match for Tasmania in 1929/30.

See also
 List of Tasmanian representative cricketers

References

External links
 

1908 births
1995 deaths
Australian cricketers
Tasmania cricketers
Cricketers from Launceston, Tasmania